PIJ may refer to:

 Islamic Jihad Movement in Palestine, known in the West as Palestinian Islamic Jihad, a Palestinian Islamist organization formed in 1981
 Palestine–Israel Journal, a non-profit journal based in Jerusalem
 pij, the ISO 639-3 abbreviation for the Pijao language
 Proximal interphalangeal joints, one of two sets of joints in the Interphalangeal joints of the hand
 Public Interest Journalism Foundation, formerly at the Swinburne University of Technology, Australia
 Public Interest Journalistic Freedom, independent successor organisation to Public Interest Journalism Foundation, based in the UK
 Public Insight Network, an approach to journalism created by American Public Media, US